Kami Reh Gaee is a 2013 Pakistani drama serial directed and written by Kashif Nisar and produced by Khawar Azhar. It stars Nauman Ejaz, Mehwish Hayat and Irsa Ghazal in lead roles.

Cast
 Noman Ejaz as Waqar
 Mehwish Hayat as Laila
 Irsa Ghazal as Maham
 Jahanzeb Gurchani
 Agha Ali as Ali
 Uzma Hassan
 Saba Faisal
 Seemi Raheel
 Haseeb Khan 
 Abdullah Ejaz 
 Imran Rizvi
 Zahid Qureshi
 Faiza Gillani
 Anushey Asad

Awards and nominations

13th Lux Style Awards
Best TV Actor Terrestrial-Nauman Ijaz
Best TV Actress Terrestrial-Mehwish Hayat

Nominations
Best TV Play

See also
 List of PTV dramas

References

External links
 

Pakistan Television Corporation original programming
Pakistani drama television series
Urdu-language television shows
2012 Pakistani television series debuts
2013 Pakistani television series endings